The 1978–79 Georgetown Hoyas men's basketball team represented Georgetown University during the 1978–79 NCAA Division I college basketball season. John Thompson, coached them in his seventh season as head coach. An independent, Georgetown played its home games at McDonough Gymnasium on the Georgetown campus in Washington, D.C., and finished the season with a record of 24–5. The team won the ECAC South-Upstate Region tournament championship, earning its first NCAA tournament bid since 1976. The Hoyas received a first-round bye and lost in the second round to Rutgers.

Season recap

The Hoyas began the year with an exhibition game against the Chinese national team, a game made possible by co-sponsorship by the National Committee on United States–China Relations of a five-game tour of the United States by the Chinese men's and women's teams.

Back from a summer playing overseas with an Eastern College Athletic Conference (ECAC) all-star team, junior guard John Duren took the lead on the court as point guard again this season. He averaged 14.6 points, 5.4 assists, and 35.3 minutes played per game during the season and played eight complete games, setting a single-season school record of 1,024 minutes played, and shot nearly 50 percent from the field and 83 percent from the free-throw line. In the final game of the regular season on February 24, 1979, he scored 22 points and had six assists against Holy Cross.

Junior forward Craig "Big Sky" Shelton led the team in rebounds and shooting percentage, shooting 60% from the field for the season. Against Oral Roberts on January 31, 1979, he had a season-high 26 points and 12 rebounds.

Freshman guard Eric "Sleepy" Floyd did not start in the first two games of the season, but he scored 28 points against Maryland on November 28, 1978, in the second game. He started the seasons third game, against St. Bonaventure on December 2, the first of 128 consecutive starts he made for the Hoyas. Against Holy Cross in the regular-season finale, he grabbed 14 rebounds, a record for a Georgetown guard, later matched by Perry McDonald but never exceeded. During the season, he scored in double figures 26 times, shot 81.3 percent from the free throw line, and ended the season with a 15-for-15 free throw streak. He finished the season as the teams leading scorer, and set a freshman record of 480 points scored. Floyd was destined to become one of the great players in Georgetown history, leading the team in scoring in each of his four seasons.

Senior forward and team co-captain Steve Martin provided experienced leadership to the team. He scored 20 points against St. Bonaventure and 20 against Indiana, had 14 points and shot 10-for-11 (90.9%) from the free-throw line against Boston College, scored 20 points against George Washington, and scored in double figures in each of the teams last six games before its appearance in the 1979 NCAA Division I men's basketball tournament.

Although retaining its status as an independent, Georgetown was in its fifth season as a member of the Eastern College Athletic Conference (ECAC), a loosely organized sports federation that held three regional post-season Division I basketball tournaments in 1979 for independent Eastern colleges and universities similar to the end-of-season conference tournaments held by conventional college basketball conferences, with each tournament winner receiving an at-large bid to the 1979 NCAA basketball tournament. The Hoyas had won their regional tournament in 1975 and 1976 to earn an NCAA Tournament bid, but had been knocked out of their ECAC tournament in the semifinals the past two years and had to settle for a berth in the National Invitation Tournament. This season, they played in the ECAC South-Upstate Region tournament. After defeating Old Dominion in the semifinal, they met No.6-ranked Syracuse in the final. John Duren had 17 points, six assists, and seven steals and the Hoyas scored on 30 free throws to Syracuses six. The Hoyas upset Syracuse to win their third ECAC regional tournament championship in five years and earn their first NCAA Tournament bid since 1976.

In the first of 14 consecutive Georgetown NCAA Tournament appearances, the Hoyas were the No. 3 seed in the East Region of the 1979 NCAA Tournament. They received a first-round bye, but were upset in the second round by the regions No. 6 seed, 18th-ranked Rutgers. It was the second straight year that the Scarlet Knights had defeated the Hoyas in a postseason tournament.

As a team, the Hoyas shot 51 percent from the field during the season. They finished the season unranked in the Associated Press Poll but ranked 12th in the final Coaches' Poll.

This was Georgetowns 38th and final season of play as an independent after the dissolution of the Eastern Intercollegiate Conference at the end of the 1938-39 season, and it also saw Georgetowns final appearance in an ECAC tournament. In the following season, the Hoyas would play as one of the seven founding members of the new Big East Conference, which held its own end-of-season tournament.

Roster
Sources

Rankings

Source

1978–79 schedule and results

Sources.
 All times are Eastern

|-
!colspan=9 style="background:#002147; color:#8D817B;"| Exhibition

|-
!colspan=9 style="background:#002147; color:#8D817B;"| Regular season

|-
!colspan=9 style="background:#002147; color:#8D817B;"| ECAC South-Upstate Region tournament

|-
!colspan=9 style="background:#002147; color:#8D817B;"| NCAA tournament

Notes

References

Georgetown Hoyas men's basketball seasons
Georgetown
Georgetown Hoyas men's basketball team
Georgetown Hoyas men's basketball team
Georgetown